Rudra is a 1989 Indian Kannada-language action film directed & written by K. S. R. Das. The film starred Vishnuvardhan and Khushbu along with Vajramuni, K. S. Ashwath and Lohithaswa in supporting roles. The film's music is scored by Gangai Amaren and the cinematography is by Lakshman. The film was dubbed in Tamil as Khushboo Khushboothaan. Das remade the film in Telugu as Inspector Rudra starring Krishna.

Cast

Vishnuvardhan
Khushbu
Charuhasan
Aruna
Vajramuni
K. S. Ashwath
Pandari Bai
Vijayakashi
Balakrishna
Sundar Krishna Urs
Mysore Lokesh
Lohithaswa
Abhinaya

Soundtrack
The music of the film was composed by Gangai Amaren who was credited as Amar. Audio was released on Sangeetha Music label.

References

External links
 

1989 films
1980s Kannada-language films
1980s action drama films
Indian action drama films
Films scored by Gangai Amaran
Kannada films remade in other languages